Bucșani is a commune located in Giurgiu County, Muntenia, Romania.

Villages
The commune is composed of seven villages: Anghelești, Bucșani, Goleasca, Obedeni, Podișor, Uiești and Vadu Lat.

Vadu Lat
Vadu Lat (sometimes spelled Vadul-Lat) is a village in Bucșani commune.

The village has a middle school and a psychiatric hospital. One of the most important employers in the county is Baza Vadu Lat (a small storehouse that buys the crops from farmers in the region). The society was listed on the RASDAQ Exchange until 2002. It is now owned by Cargill.

In antiquity, this area was the home of the Gumelnița Culture.

Natives
 Ilie Nițu

External links

  About the Bucșani City Hall and the projects for Vadu Lat

Notes

Communes in Giurgiu County
Localities in Muntenia